Declaration of Power (officially 超実力派宣言 〜Declaration of Power〜) was a professional wrestling event produced by New Japan Pro-Wrestling (NJPW). It took place on October 10, 2022 in Tokyo, Japan at Ryōgoku Kokugikan. The show most notably featured the announcement of the new NJPW World Television Championship and the return of CMLL wrestler Titán, who joined Los Ingobernables de Japon, as the first full time foreign member.

Storylines 
Declaration of Power featured nine professional wrestling matches that involved different wrestlers from pre-existing scripted feuds and storylines. Wrestlers portrayed villains, heroes, or less distinguishable characters in the scripted events that built tension and culminated in a wrestling match or series of matches.

Results

References

2022 in Tokyo
2022 in professional wrestling
Events in Tokyo
New Japan Pro-Wrestling shows
Professional wrestling in Tokyo